Azel Randolph Lusby (23 August 1907 – 30 August 1995) was a Canadian lawyer and politician. Lusby served as a Liberal party member of the House of Commons of Canada. He was born in Amherst, Nova Scotia.

He received his Bachelor of Arts degree at Acadia University, then a Bachelor of Laws at Dalhousie University after which he worked as a barrister. Lusby was the Prosecuting Officer for Cumberland County, Nova Scotia between 1939 and 1953.

Lusby was first elected to Parliament at the Cumberland riding in the 1953 general election. After serving his only federal term, the 22nd Canadian Parliament, he was defeated by Robert Coates of the Progressive Conservative party. Lusby then unsuccessfully tried to unseat Coates in the 1958 election. He died at his Amherst, Nova Scotia home in 1995, aged 88.

References

External links
 

1907 births
1995 deaths
Acadia University alumni
Dalhousie University alumni
Members of the House of Commons of Canada from Nova Scotia
Liberal Party of Canada MPs
Lawyers in Nova Scotia
20th-century Canadian lawyers